Tengku Ampuan Hajah Jemaah binti Almarhum Raja Ahmad (Jawi: تڠكو امڤوان حاجه جماعه بنت المرحوم راج احمد; - ) was the second Raja Permaisuri Agong of Malaysia during the brief reign of her husband, Sultan Hisamuddin Alam Shah Al-Haj ibni Almarhum Sultan Alaeddin Sulaiman Shah. She was also Tengku Ampuan of Selangor during her husband's reign as Sultan of Selangor.

Biography 
Born in 1900, in Bandar Termasha, Kuala Langat, Selangor, she was a member of a junior branch of the Selangor royal family. She was a descendants of first Sultan of Selangor. She received her early education in a Malay School near the Bandar Termasha Palace.

In 1920, Tengku Ampuan Jema'ah married Sultan Hisamuddin Alam Shah who was then the royal escort to Sultan Alaiddin Sulaiman Shah. In 1924, hence she became the special escort to Tengku Ampuan Fatimah.

In 1926, Tengku Ampuan Jema’ah gave birth to a son, Tengku Abdul Aziz Shah, who later became the 8th Sultan of Selangor.

In 1952, Tengku Ampuan Jema'ah performed the pilgrimage in Makkah and in the following year she accompanied Sultan Hishamuddin Alam Shah for the Coronation of Queen Elizabeth II in United Kingdom.

Her husband, Sultan Alam Shah, died of a mysterious illness at Istana Tetamu in Kuala Lumpur on 1 September 1960 - the day fixed for his installation. According to then Prime Minister Tunku Abdul Rahman, the ruler had been struck down by illness after using the royal regalia in advance of his installation. His death occurred after 27 days of illness.  He was buried at the Royal Mausoleum near Sultan Sulaiman Mosque in Klang, Selangor on 3 September 1960.

Following her husband's death, Tengku Ampuan Jema'ah lived in quiet retirement until her death on 8 April 1973.

Her only child succeeded his father as Sultan of Selangor and as Sultan Salahuddin Abdul Aziz Shah ibni Almarhum Sultan Hisamuddin Alam Shah Al-Haj. He also reigned as Malaysia's eleventh Yang di-Pertuan Agong. But like his father, he died while in office.

Social Contributions
Tengku Ampuan Jema’ah had a keen interest in trying out various types of handicraft at the palace. She was good at knitting, embroidery and patch work. When she moved to Klang, she gathered women from the villages and started a handicraft training programme for them. The craftwork was sent to Raffles Hotel in Singapore under the brand name “Pertukangan Tangan Melayu Selangor” (The Selangor Malay Handicrafts) and sponsored by the wife of the Governor of Singapore back then. The Malay Handicrafts Shop was first opened in Klang. Subsequently, another branch was opened at the Robinson Shop in Kuala Lumpur with the assistance of its manager.

The "Gerai Selangor" (Selangor Booth) at the Malaysian Agriculture, Horticulture and Agrotourism (MAHA) exhibition in Kuala Lumpur attracted many European tourists. Several awards for silverwork won by the said booth are on display at the Istana Shah Alam Museum. These awards were the result of Tengku Ampuan Jema’ah’s effort.

Awards and recognitions
 First Class of the Royal Family Order of Selangor (DK I) (1973)

Places named after her
Several places were named after her, including: 
 Tengku Ampuan Jemaah Hospital in Sabak Bernam, Selangor
 Tengku Ampuan Jemaah Mosque in Shah Alam, Selangor
 SAM Tengku Ampuan Jemaah, secondary school in Sungai Besar, Selangor
 SAMT Tengku Ampuan Jemaah, secondary school in Shah Alam, Selangor
 SMK Tengku Ampuan Jemaah, secondary school in Pelabuhan Klang, Selangor

See also 
Yang di-Pertuan Agong
Raja Permaisuri Agong

References

1900 births
Malaysian people of Bugis descent
1973 deaths
People from Selangor
Royal House of Selangor
Selangor royal consorts
Malaysian royal consorts
First Classes of Royal Family Order of Selangor
Malaysian people of Malay descent
Malaysian Muslims
Malaysian queens consort